William Furness may refer to:

 William Henry Furness (1802–1896), American clergyman, theologian, and reformer
 William Henry Furness Jr. (1827–1867), American portrait painter
 William Henry Furness III (1866–1920), American physician, ethnographer and author
 William Anthony Furness, 2nd Viscount Furness (1929–1995), British peer